Ruslan and Ludmila is a 1972 film directed by Aleksandr Ptushko. It is based on the poem of the same name written by Alexander Pushkin in 1820.

It is the last of the many fairytale films Ptushko directed, and, according to film critics, the most successful. Ptushko died a year after this film was released.

Plot
The hero of the movie is the bogatyr Ruslan who sets off in search of his kidnapped bride, Ludmila. To rescue his beloved, he will have to overcome many obstacles, and battle the sorcerers Chernomor and Naina.

Cast
 Valeri Kozinets as Ruslan (voiced by Feliks Yavorsky)
 Natalya Petrova as Lyudmila (voiced by Nina Gulyaeva)
 Vladimir Fyodorov as Chernomor the Wizard (voiced by Valery Nosik)
 Maria Kapnist as Naina the Witch (as Maria Kapnist-Serko)
 Andrei Abrikosov as Vladimir
 Igor Yasulovich as Finn
 Vyacheslav Nevinny as Farlaf
 Oleg Mokshantsev as Rogdai
 Ruslan Akhmetov as Ratmir
 Sergey Martinson as Ambassador
Eve Kivi as fisherwoman
Valery Nosik as messenger

Awards
1976 — the International film festival of children's and youthful movies in Salerno (Italy) — a special award of jury

The edition on video
In 1990 in the USSR the movie is released on VHS by the film association "Krupnyy Plan".

External links 

Ruslan And Ludmila at Cinema Strikes Back

1972 films
1970s children's fantasy films
1970s fantasy adventure films
1970s Russian-language films
Russian fantasy adventure films
Russian children's fantasy films
Sword and sorcery films
Films based on works by Aleksandr Pushkin
Films directed by Aleksandr Ptushko
Films based on Russian folklore
Films based on Slavic mythology
Kievan Rus in fiction
Films based on fairy tales
Films scored by Tikhon Khrennikov
Soviet children's films
Soviet epic films